Lemanis may refer to:

Andrej Lemanis (born 1969), a Latvian Australian basketball player and coach
Lemanis Valley, a mountain valley in Antarctica
Portus Lemanis, a Roman Saxon shore fort in Kent, England